In mathematics, a Gregory number, named after James Gregory, is a real number of the form:

 

where x is any rational number greater or equal to 1.  Considering the power series expansion for arctangent, we have

 

Setting x = 1 gives the well-known Leibniz formula for pi. Thus, in particular,

is a Gregory number.

Properties

See also
 Størmer number

References

Sets of real numbers